Telijjawila Central College(commonly known as "Telijjawila Central College") is a government school for boys and girls in TelijjawilaMatara, Sri Lanka . The college is situated in a hilly area, close to Weligama Akuressa main road with natural surroundings. The college was initially founded as a Buddhist school in 1954. The college presently consists of over 2500 student population with children studying from primary level to secondary level education with a faculty of 130 teachers.

School History

The college functioned in this premises until 1955 during which year it was shifted to the present location at Udukawa the hillock facing the paddy fields with a rich scenic beauty.

A Central college for Telijjawila, under the scheme for taking education to village, by late Dr. C.W.W. Kannnagara, would not have been a reality, if not for the great efforts made by the late David Wanigasekara, and Pujya. Naranda Thero of, Wajiraramaya, Bambalapitiya.

The college commenced its operation on 17 January 1946 at Telijjawila junction, in a small building, thatched with coconut leaves. It had nearly 200 students and the staff consisted of three teachers. The pioneer teachers were DH Wickramasekara and UA Podinona. The first principal was HL Wimalasuriya from Gnanodaya Vidyalaya at Kalutara.

Wickramaratne Walawwa was used as the boys' hostel and Girls' was established at Samarasinghe walawwa Bibugodella watta.

Despite a shortage of buildings and other facilities, the school quickly became well-known and one of the best schools in Ceylon, Medium of instruction was English till 1956.

The school was declared open during the tenure of principal RB Gallella on 15 July 1955, by the then Hon. Prime Minister Sir John Kotalawala. He was a prominent educationalist and a disciplinarian who won the hearts of all students. And served until he was transferred to Maho central college in February 1957.

In 1948, the school moved to new buildings constructed in land acquired by the government, to its present location, which consisted of an assembly hall, classrooms, administrative blocks, crafts rooms, and two hostel blocks.

Educational institutions established in 1954
Schools in Matara, Sri Lanka
Schools in Matara District
1954 establishments in Ceylon